Wolf Alice are an English rock band from London, England. Formed in 2010 as an acoustic duo comprising singer Ellie Rowsell and guitarist Joff Oddie, Wolf Alice have also featured bassist Theo Ellis and drummer Joel Amey since 2012.

Wolf Alice played their first gig at Highbury Garage, December 2010 supporting April in the Shade, after Rowsell and Oddie met the band at an open mic at the Hope and Anchor, Islington. They released their debut single "Fluffy" in February 2013 and followed it with "Bros" in May. They released their debut EP Blush in October, and its follow-up Creature Songs in May 2014. In February 2015, the band released the lead single "Giant Peach" from their debut album My Love Is Cool, which was released in June 2015. It includes their 2014 single "Moaning Lisa Smile", which peaked at number nine on US Billboards Alternative Songs chart in August 2015, and was nominated for the 2016 Grammy Award for Best Rock Performance.

The band released their second studio album Visions of a Life in September 2017. It debuted at number two on the UK Albums Chart, and received universal acclaim from music critics. Ranked as one of the year's best albums by multiple publications, the album won the 2018 Mercury Prize. The band released their third studio album Blue Weekend in June 2021. Wolf Alice won the 2022 Brit Award for British Group.

History

2010–2016: Formation, EPs and My Love Is Cool
Wolf Alice were formed in 2010 and began as an acoustic duo between Ellie Rowsell and Joff Oddie. Their name came from a short story by Angela Carter. Eventually deciding to add electric elements to their sound, they recruited Rowsell's childhood friend Sadie Cleary to play bass and Oddie's friend James DC to be their drummer. They self-released an EP called Wolf Alice that year, featuring three songs: "Every Cloud", "Wednesday", and "Destroy Me".

When James DC broke his wrist in 2012, Joel Amey joined the band as a temporary replacement drummer, but later became a permanent member. In that same year, Cleary left to focus on her studies. Theo Ellis was then recruited as their bassist in late 2012. They released the song "Leaving You" online on SoundCloud as a free download which gained airplay from BBC Radio 1 and featured in NMEs 'Radar' section. After the song was released, they toured with Peace, and recorded a session for Huw Stephens' Radio 1 show in January. They released their first physical single "Fluffy" in February 2013 on the Chess Club label.

Wolf Alice released their second single "Bros" in May on Chess Club Records. "Bros" is one of the first songs that Rowsell wrote, which the band played in their early stages, leading to a tour where the band were supported by bands such as Dressed Like Wolves and Dead New Blood. In October 2013, Wolf Alice released their first official EP called Blush, which was preceded by the release of "She".

In December 2013, they were chosen as the single most blogged about artist in the UK in that year by BBC Radio 6 Music. In 2014, they signed to Dirty Hit and released their second EP Creature Songs in May. In December 2014, the band were named "Best Breakthrough Artist" at the UK Festival Awards.

In late February 2015, Wolf Alice announced their debut album My Love Is Cool, and released the first single from the album, "Giant Peach". In April, they released a reworked version of the fan favourite "Bros" as the second single from their debut album. On 10 June, the band shared a new track, "You're a Germ". My Love Is Cool was released on 22 June, debuting at number two on the UK Albums Chart and receiving highly positive reviews. Later that year, they released "You're a Germ" and "Freazy" as singles, as well as "Lisbon" in 2016. Later in 2016, they toured as a support act for The 1975's tour in the US. 

Filmmaker Michael Winterbottom followed Wolf Alice as they toured in support of My Love Is Cool. He filmed the band and also inserted two actors among them, playing members of the road crew, with a fictional love story developing as they moved from gig to gig. The resulting docudrama film, On the Road, was released in October 2016. According to Deadspin, "In the documentary, Winterbottom captures 16 different gigs and daily life backstage from the point of view of a new member of their crew."

2017–2020: Visions of a Life, Mercury Prize Win

In June 2017, Wolf Alice released the lead single "Yuk Foo" off their second studio album, Visions of a Life. They released three more singles, "Don't Delete the Kisses", "Beautifully Unconventional", and "Heavenward", before the release of their album on 28 September. In 2018, they also released "Formidable Cool", "Sadboy" and "Space & Time" as singles from the album.

The band toured throughout 2018, including dates supporting Foo Fighters during their Concrete and Gold Tour and Queens of the Stone Age as part of their Villains World Tour. They also supported Liam Gallagher at his concert at Finsbury Park on 29 June 2018.

In September 2018, Visions of a Life won the 2018 Mercury Prize.

2021–present: Blue Weekend
On 15 February 2021, the band's website was updated to show a looping video of an eye, with the heading "The Last Man on Earth". On 22 February 2021, the band announced that their single "The Last Man on Earth" would be released on 24 February 2021, and would debut on Annie Mac's show on BBC Radio 1. The release of the single was backed by the announcement of their third studio album, Blue Weekend, which was released on 4 June 2021. The second single from the album, "Smile", was released on 20 April 2021.

Blue Weekend received widespread critical acclaim, and was nominated for the 2021 Mercury Prize. On release, music publication The Forty-Five called Blue Weekend "a ballsy idyll of feeling: the sound of a band satisfying themselves rather than proving themselves, and completely filling the space they’ve carved out over the years." 

Wolf Alice won the 2022 Brit Award for Group of the Year.

On October 29th 2021, the band released Blue Weekend: Tour Deluxe which includes four live versions of tracks from the album ('Smile', 'How Can I Make it OK', 'Safe From Heartbreak', and 'The Last Man on Earth') as well as a live cover of 'Bobby' by Alex G.

On 5 May 2022, the band released a lullaby version of "The Last Man on Earth" as a single and announced Blue Lullaby, an EP featuring reworked lullaby versions of five tracks from Blue Weekend, which was subsequently released on 24 June 2022. During the summer of 2022, the band played 17 shows supporting Harry Styles' Love On Tour, the first date in Hamburg on the 26th of June and the last show in Lisbon on the 31st of July.

Musical style and influences
While the group's early material was folk-tinged pop, they became more rock-oriented after the rhythm section joined. Generally, the band's musical style has been described as alternative rock, indie rock, and shoegaze, with elements of dream pop, folk, grunge, pop, and electronic. Clash described the band as "the lovechild of folk and grunge". The "Fluffy" single saw the band compared to Elastica and Hole, while the single's B-side, "White Leather", saw comparisons to The xx. Kitty Empire, writing in The Observer, described their sound as "an engaging strain of off-kilter indie rock". The band describe their music as "rocky pop". The Telegraph declare Wolf Alice's debut album as 'feral and sophisticated' in review.

In interviews, the band has cited their liking for The Vines, the Beatles, Siouxsie and the Banshees, Blur, and Courtney Love.

Rowsell's voice type is classified as soprano.

Band members

Current members
 Ellie Rowsell – lead vocals, guitar, keyboards, synthesizers, piano (2010–present)
 Joff Oddie – guitar, violin, synthesizers, backing vocals (2010–present)
 Theo Ellis – bass guitar, synthesizers, backing vocals (2012–present)
 Joel Amey – drums, percussion, synthesizers, backing vocals (2012–present)

Current touring musicians
 Ryan Malcolm – keyboards, synthesizers, piano, percussion, backing vocals (2021–present)

Former members
 Sadie Cleary – bass (2010–2012)
 James DC – drums (2010–2012)

Discography

Studio albums

My Love Is Cool (2015)
Visions of a Life (2017)
Blue Weekend (2021)

Awards and nominations

References

External links

 

 

2010 establishments in England
English indie rock groups
Musical groups established in 2010
Musical groups from London
Musical quartets
Brit Award winners
NME Awards winners
RCA Records artists
Dirty Hit artists
Dream pop musical groups
Female-fronted musical groups